Stephen Lybrook Neal (born November 7, 1934) is a former North Carolina Democratic politician who served ten terms in the U.S. House of Representatives (1975–1995).

Born in Winston-Salem, North Carolina, Neal moved to California, graduated from Narbonne High School in Lomita in 1952, and eventually graduated from the University of Hawaii in 1959.

He defeated Joe Felmet in the primary election, and won an upset victory over incumbent Republican Wilmer Mizell. Neal benefited from voter anger over the Watergate Scandal, which resulted in dozens of Republican incumbents being defeated. He was reelected nine more times against vigorous opposition in a district that stretched from Winston-Salem to the Blue Ridge, even as the area grew more conservative.

He chose not to seek re-election in 1994, and his seat was won that November by his 1992 opponent, future Senator Richard Burr.

References

External links

University of Hawaiʻi at Mānoa alumni
1934 births
Living people
Democratic Party members of the United States House of Representatives from North Carolina
Narbonne High School alumni